The 2009–10 international cricket season was between September 2009 and March 2010. Australia had a very successful season that included winning the ICC Champions Trophy and a home season in which they were undefeated against the touring West Indies and Pakistan.

Season overview

Pre-season rankings

September

Tri-Series in Sri Lanka

2009 ICC Champions Trophy

The 2009 ICC Champions Trophy was scheduled to take place in the 2008–09 season in Pakistan, but because of an unstable security situation, it was rescheduled for the 2009–10 season. The hosting rights were also moved from Pakistan to South Africa. Sri Lanka was considered as a potential host, but was discarded due to worries related to the weather during that time of the year in Sri Lanka.

Group stage

Knockouts

October

Kenya in Zimbabwe

Australia in India

Australia played seven ODIs in India from 25 October to 11 November 2009. The seven ODIs complemented the Test series that took place between the two nations in 2008 in India.

Zimbabwe in Bangladesh

Hong Kong Cricket Sixes

November

Pakistan v New Zealand in UAE

Zimbabwe in South Africa

England in South Africa

Sri Lanka in India

Pakistan in New Zealand

Although being played in New Zealand, this is a "home" series for Pakistan.

West Indies in Australia

December

Pakistan in Australia

January

Tri-series in Bangladesh

U-19 World Cup

India in Bangladesh

2010 Associates Twenty20 Series in Kenya

February

2010 Quadrangular Twenty20 Series in Sri Lanka

Bangladesh in New Zealand

South Africa in India

2010 ICC World Twenty20 Qualifier

The top two teams progressed to the 2010 ICC World Twenty20 in the Caribbean.

Group stage

Super Four

Final

Kenya vs Netherlands

Afghanistan vs Canada in UAE

England vs Pakistan

2010 ICC World Cricket League Division Five

Group stage

Playoffs

Final Placings

After the conclusion of the tournament the teams were distributed as follows:

Australia in New Zealand

Zimbabwe in West Indies

England in Bangladesh

Season summary

Result summary

Milestones

Test
  Rahul Dravid reached 11,000 Test runs vs  on 16 November.
  Sachin Tendulkar reached 13,000 Test runs vs  on 17 January.

ODI
  Sachin Tendulkar reached 17,000 ODI runs vs  on 5 November.

Records

Test
  Sachin Tendulkar reached 13,000 runs in Test, vs  on 17 January

ODI

  Sachin Tendulkar reached 17,000 runs in ODI, vs  on 5 November. (1st time in the Cricket History)
  Sachin Tendulkar became the 1st male cricketer to hit 200 in ODI, vs  on 24 February.

References

 
2009 in cricket
2010 in cricket